The BRAND'S Health Museum is a museum in Changhua Coastal Industrial Park, Lukang Township, Changhua County, Taiwan.

History
The museum was set up by BRAND'S Essences in November 2003 at the Changhua Coastal Industrial Park. Overhaul renovations were done in April and May 2008.

Architecture
The museum consists of four exhibition areas, which are the brand story house, multimedia interactive experience area, health market and skywalk.

See also
 List of museums in Taiwan

References

External links

 

2003 establishments in Taiwan
Industry museums in Taiwan
Medical museums in Taiwan
Museums established in 2003
Museums in Changhua County